WGGE is a Country formatted broadcast radio station licensed to Parkersburg, West Virginia, serving the Mid-Ohio Valley.  WGGE is owned and operated by Burbach Broadcasting Company.

External links
 Froggy 99 Online
 
 
 

GGE